Pure Chess is a chess video game by British developer VooFoo Studios.

Release 
Pure Chess was released for the PlayStation Vita and the PlayStation 3. The PS3 version of the game is only available through digital download via the PlayStation Store. The PS3 version of Pure Chess was released on April 11, 2012, in Europe and on May 29, 2012, in North America. A PlayStation 4 version was later released on April 15, 2014 in North America and April 16, 2014 in Europe. A physical edition of this version was also published as a budget title by System 3 under their Play It label.

Pure Chess was announced for Wii U during an August 2013 Nintendo Direct for the PAL region. The game's publisher Ripstone later confirmed the game for the Nintendo 3DS as well. In addition, it was also confirmed that cross-platform play will be supported between both Wii U and Nintendo 3DS versions, as well as with players playing the mobile versions of the game, and possibly even Sony's PlayStation consoles.

On September 9, 2016, Pure Chess: Grandmaster Edition was made available for the Xbox One and PC using Steam.

Reception

Commercial
Pure Chess was the 11th best-selling PlayStation Network game and the 4th best-selling PS Vita game in June 2012.

Critical

The single-player mode of Pure Chess was praised by IGN. However, reviewers found the online multi-player mode disappointing.

References

2012 video games
Android (operating system) games
Chess software
IOS games
Nintendo 3DS eShop games
Nintendo Network games
PlayStation 3 games
PlayStation 4 games
PlayStation Vita games
PlayStation Network games
Video games developed in the United Kingdom
Video games with cross-platform play
Wii U eShop games